Kishan Chand Parwani  is a Pakistani politician who served as member of the National Assembly of Pakistan.

Political career
He was elected to the National Assembly of Pakistan on a seat reserved for minorities as a candidate of Pakistan Muslim League (Q) in the 2008 Pakistani general election.

References

Pakistani Hindus
Sindhi people
Pakistani MNAs 2008–2013